Ali Fatemi  (November 2, 1993) is an Iranian footballer who plays for Malavan in the Azadegan League as a striker and winger.

Career

Youth teams 
Fatemi was a member of the Persepolis, Naft Mahmoudabad and Rah Ahan Youth Academy. He played for Rah Ahan U21 in AFC Vision Asia U-21 Tehran Premier League.

Persepolis
After graduating from Rah Ahan Academy he had training with Persepolis. He played in few friendlies and scored against Padideh. He passed technical test alongside three other players and signed a three-years contract with Persepolis on 9 July 2014. He made his debut for Persepolis in 2–0 win against Saba Qom as a substitute for Omid Alishah on 30 August 2014.

Club career statistics

 Assist Goals

References

External links

 Ali Fatemi at IranLeague
 Ali Fatemi at PersianLeague

1993 births
Living people
People from Amol
Iranian footballers
Persepolis F.C. players
Association football wingers
Association football forwards
Sportspeople from Mazandaran province